Jean Evelyn Roberts (born 18 August 1943) is a former Australian Olympic athlete who competed in the shot put and discus throw events.

She competed for the Coburg club, alongside athletes such as Raelene Boyle and Carolyn Lewis.

Roberts won a total of 13 Australian Championships in Athletics between 1962 and 1970, including eight in the Shot.  She also won two British Championships in the Shot Put in 1971 and 1972.

Jean was a versatile athlete, winning the 1967 Victorian State Pentathlon championship with 3985 points
and placing second in 1969.

She competed at four Commonwealth Games between 1962 and 1974, winning medals on each occasion, and represented Australia at the 1968 Olympic Games in Mexico City. Her elder sister Val Roberts competed in gymnastics at the 1960 and 1964 Olympics.

Jean won the discus throw at the Pacific Conference Games in 1969 at Tokyo.

Jean also won the 1973 and 1975 American Athletic Union championships in the discus.

Jean received her Doctorate of Education from Temple University in the mid 1970s and then coached and taught at the University of New Hampshire.

She was the first Director of Coaching for the Australian Athletic Union from 1979 -'85 and then an administrator at the Australian Institute of Sport until 2001. There she ran the Olympic Training Centre Programs for athletes, coaches and sports medicine practitioners from Oceania and ten African countries.

See also
 Australian athletics champions (Women)

References

1943 births
Living people
Australian female shot putters
Australian female discus throwers
Olympic athletes of Australia
Athletes (track and field) at the 1968 Summer Olympics
Commonwealth Games silver medallists for Australia
Commonwealth Games bronze medallists for Australia
Commonwealth Games medallists in athletics
Athletes (track and field) at the 1962 British Empire and Commonwealth Games
Athletes (track and field) at the 1966 British Empire and Commonwealth Games
Athletes (track and field) at the 1970 British Commonwealth Games
Athletes (track and field) at the 1974 British Commonwealth Games
Australian pentathletes
Sportspeople from Geelong
20th-century Australian women
Medallists at the 1962 British Empire and Commonwealth Games
Medallists at the 1966 British Empire and Commonwealth Games
Medallists at the 1970 British Commonwealth Games
Medallists at the 1974 British Commonwealth Games